The 1991–92 Taça de Portugal was the 53rd edition of the Portuguese football knockout tournament, organized by the Portuguese Football Federation (FPF). The 1991–92 Taça de Portugal began in September 1991. The final was played on 24 May 1992 at the Estádio Nacional.

Porto were the previous holders, having defeated Beira-Mar 3–1 in the previous season's final. Boavista defeated cup holders Porto, 2–1 in the final. As a result of Boavista winning the domestic cup competition, the Panteras faced 1991–92 Primeira Divisão winners Porto in the 1992 Supertaça Cândido de Oliveira.

Semi-finals
Ties were played between the 22 April and 7 May.

Final

References

Taça de Portugal seasons
Taca De Portugal, 1991-92
1991–92 domestic association football cups